1999 in television may refer to:

 1999 in American television
 1999 in Australian television
 1999 in Belgian television
 1999 in Brazilian television
 1999 in British television
 1999 in Canadian television
 1999 in Croatian television
 1999 in Czech television
 1999 in Danish television
 1999 in Dutch television
 1999 in Estonian television
 1999 in French television
 1999 in German television
 1999 in Irish television
 1999 in Israeli television
 1999 in Italian television
 1999 in Japanese television
 1999 in New Zealand television
 1999 in Norwegian television
 1999 in Philippine television
 1999 in Polish television
 1999 in Portuguese television
 1999 in Scottish television
 1999 in South African television
 1999 in Swedish television